Nibert is a surname. Notable people with the surname include: 

David Nibert (born 1953), American sociologist, author, and professor
Greg Nibert (born 1958), American politician
Gregg Nibert (born 1957), American basketball coach